2005–06 Belarusian Cup was the 15th edition of the football knock-out competition in Belarus.

First round
13 teams from the Second League, all 16 teams from the First League and 3 amateur clubs started competition in this round. The games were played on 14 and 15 June 2005.

Round of 32
16 winners of previous round were joined by 14 clubs from Premier League. Two winners of previous round (Baranovichi and Polotsk) advanced to the Round of 16 by drawing of lots. The games were played on 23 and 24 July 2005.

Round of 16
The games were played on 21 September 2005.

Quarterfinals
The first legs were played on April 1, 2006. The second legs were played on April 5, 2006.

|}

First leg

Second leg

Semifinals
The first legs were played on April 10, 2006. The second legs were played on April 14, 2006.

|}

First leg

Second leg

Final

External links
RSSSF

Belarusian Cup seasons
Belarusian Cup
Cup
Cup